Baker is the code-name for a series of training exercises conducted by the United States Army and several Asian countries which hosted the exercises. The purpose of the exercises is to practice and develop counter-narcotics operations.

Some of the operations in this series include:

Baker Blade: Classified exercise.
Baker Mint: Conducted by the US Army and Malaysia in 1997. 
Baker Mint 99-1: Conducted by the US Army and Malaysia in 1999. Trained on military intelligence and photo-surveillance.
Baker Mint Lens 99: Conducted by the US Army and Malaysia in 1999.
Baker Mondial V: Conducted by the US Army and Mongolia in 1997. Trained on medical procedures.
Baker Mongoose II: Conducted by the US Army and Mongolia in 1995.
Baker Piston Lens 2000: Conducted by the US Army and the Philippines in 2000.
Baker Tepid: A series of eight exercises conducted by the US Army and Thailand.
Baker Torch: A series of three exercises conducted by the US Army and Thailand from 1999 to 2001. Trained on border control.
Baker Torch Lens: Conducted by the US Army and Thailand. Trained on diving.

Further reading 
 

Illegal drug trade
Military exercises and wargames
Drugs in the United States